KPSU (91.7 FM, "The Xtreme") was a non-profit educational radio station licensed to serve Goodwell, Oklahoma. KPSU was owned by Oklahoma Panhandle State University.

The station was assigned the call letters KPSU by the Federal Communications Commission (FCC).

KPSU's license was cancelled by the FCC on June 2, 2021 for failure to file a license renewal application.

References

External links
Oklahoma Panhandle State University

PSU (FM)
Oklahoma Panhandle State University
Radio stations established in 1978
1978 establishments in Oklahoma
Defunct radio stations in the United States
Radio stations disestablished in 2021
2021 disestablishments in Oklahoma
PSU